is a genre of socially conscious, left-leaning films produced in Japan during the 1920s and 1930s. Tendency films reflected a perceived leftward shift in Japanese society in the aftermath of the 1927 Shōwa financial crisis. Japan's left-wing literary figures also influenced tendency films, with films such as A Living Puppet and What Made Her Do It? being adaptations of realist shingeki plays.

Tendency films are commercial melodramas led by working-class or lower middle-class protagonists, in contrast to the documentaries produced by the Proletarian Film League of Japan. Daisuke Itō's jidaigeki films increasingly featured heroes in revolt against the social system of historical Japan, beginning with Servant (1927) and culminating with Man-Slashing, Horse-Piercing Sword (1929). Tomu Uchida's A Living Puppet is the story of an  "insincere but talented man who cannot survive within the structure of a capitalist society." Behold This Mother (1930) crossed the tendency film over with the genre of haha-mono, films which promoted the role of the mother. Reviews noted the use of editing to contrast the lives of the wealthy antagonists against those of the protagonists (their social conditions portrayed in a manner comparable to social realism). However, because Soviet films such as Battleship Potemkin and Mother were refused entry to Japan, tendency films showed little influence from Soviet montage.

Due to the pre-existing Peace Preservation Law in Japan, tendency films were censored since the first developments of the genre. Despite winning the Kinema Junpo Best One award in 1929, Masahiro Makino's Street of Masterless Samurai was cut severely. Tomu Uchida's intended follow-up to A Living Puppet, The Bluebird, was halted by censors altogether. Kenji Mizoguchi's Metropolitan Symphony won accolades abroad, but a cut version was shown in Japan: a contemporary Kinema Junpo review complained that "In the uncensored version of the film, the life of the bourgeois is shown as one of deception, corruption, and idle leisure... The contrast between the bourgeois life and proletarian life has been destroyed."  

Shigeyoshi Suzuki's tendency film What Made Her Do It? was the most financially successful of all Japanese silent films, playing for five weeks in Asakusa and two months in Osaka. The Asakusa screenings drove audiences to stamp their feet and shout political slogans in appreciation. Riots were reported by the press. The success of What Made Her Do It? prompted Japan's Home Ministry to increase its scrutiny of political films: a Censorship Review from June 1930 describes the art form as having "embarked on a concerted effort to influence the thinking of society in general." Kenji Mizoguchi distanced himself from the tendency film genre after the release of And Yet They Go On in 1931. Teppei Kataoka, screenwriter of A Living Puppet and Metropolitan Symphony, served a two-year prison sentence and underwent tenkō (forced ideological conversion) following his arrest in 1932. Japanese film critic Tadao Sato marks the end of the tendency film genre with Sotoji Kimura's 1933 film Youth Across the River.

Tendency films have been criticized as a "heavily commercialized... version of cinematic leftism." ABC Lifeline, a film about striking workers, was directed by the "nominally conservative" Yasujiro Shimazu. Many of the creators of tendency films "avoided overt political commitment" and created propaganda films for the Japanese Army and Navy as Japan's leftist movement declined. After Suzuki directed two propaganda documentaries in 1933, Sato wrote on What Made Her Do It?:If we accept the film as a work of genuine leftism, we can only marvel at the speed of his political conversion. But, as is more likely the case, if we see it merely as a rather extreme expression of social do-goodery, the question of political conversion is reduced to virtual irrelevance.Kenji Mizoguchi later directed several propaganda films, as did Tomotaka Tasaka, director of Behold This Mother. Sotoji Kimura would work under Colonel Masahiko Amakasu at the Manchukuo Film Association.

References

History of film of Japan
Film genres
Japanese words and phrases